California cooler may refer to:

 California cooler (cabinet)
 Cold pantry
 California Cooler, a brand of alcoholic beverages